is a 1956 black-and-white Japanese drama film directed by Katsuhiko Tasaka.

Plot 
Shinhachiro Hoshina, who heads east with a letter from Jinzaemon, the uncle of the Tamba-Sasayama Aoyama feudal clan, is said to have forty-eight female misfortunes waiting for him from the easy-going head temple at Sanjo Ohashi. However, as expected, he was chased by Mitsue, the daughter of Jinzaemon, Akemi, the daughter of the elder, and Kei, the bird chasing woman. Around the same time, Namiji Ryokan of the Kampaku Takatsukasa family, who carried a secret letter to Yamato Mamoru Yagyu with Ometsuke, and the thug Anasawa gang of Kyoto Shoshidai Itakura, who followed this, headed east. Upon arriving in Kusatsu, Shinhachiro tried to save Namiji, who was chased by the Anasawa crew, but Namiji was stabbed and he was given a secret letter stating, "Arrive in Edo on March 4th." Shinhachiro approached Tsuchiyama and met the daughter of a textile wholesaler in Kyoto, Masakichi, an apprentice, but Masakichi clung to Shinhachiro in Yaba. And Kuwana, at Atami's voyage, clung to eleven girls in the storm, and at Atami's inn, a great service from seven maids, and moreover, Kakubei Shishi's younger brother who was mistaken for Takashi's princess. Shinhachiro was completely surprised at the journey of the woman's trouble, but arrived in Edo with a selfish victory, which is also good at pursuing Anasawa, and passed through the gate of Yamato Yagyu according to his uncle's letter. It was. However, Mamoru Yamato called himself Shinhachiro his younger brother and was stunned. I was even more surprised when I climbed the castle to worship the shogun. Isn't there Masakichi dressed as a princess? Shinhachiro learned for the first time that Masakichi was actually the princess of the Kampaku Takatsukasa family and had the mission of directly appealing to the lords who played the bad politics of Itakura, the chief priest. On the day of the eastward descent, Shinhachiro, who had fulfilled his direct appeal, and Shinhachiro, who was regrettable, were seen on the highway, looking forward to the day when they met again.

Cast 
 Ichikawa Raizō VIII
Chocho Miyako
Koji Shimizu
Denjiro Okochi
Michiko Saga
Tomiko Ishii
Nakajiro Tomita
Kanae Kobayashi
Yuji Hamada
Michiko Ai
Keiko Koyanagi

References

External links 
 

Japanese black-and-white films
1956 films
Daiei Film films
1950s Japanese films
Japanese drama films
1956 drama films